56th NYFCC Awards
January 13, 1991

Best Film: 
 Goodfellas 
The 56th New York Film Critics Circle Awards honored the best filmmaking of 1990. The winners were announced on 18 December 1990 and the awards were given on 13 January 1991.

Winners
Best Actor:
Robert De Niro - Goodfellas and Awakenings
Runners-up: Jeremy Irons - Reversal of Fortune and Danny Glover - To Sleep with Anger
Best Actress:
Joanne Woodward - Mr. and Mrs. Bridge
Runners-up: Anjelica Huston - The Grifters and Kathy Bates - Misery
Best Cinematography:
Vittorio Storaro - The Sheltering Sky
Runner-up: Michael Ballhaus - Goodfellas
Best Director:
Martin Scorsese - Goodfellas
Runner-up: Bernardo Bertolucci - The Sheltering Sky
Best Film:
Goodfellas
Runners-up: Mr. and Mrs. Bridge, The Grifters and Reversal of Fortune
Best Foreign Film:
The Nasty Girl (Das schreckliche Mädchen) • West Germany
Runners-up: Cyrano de Bergerac • France and Cinema Paradiso (Nuovo cinema Paradiso) • Italy
Best New Director:
Whit Stillman - Metropolitan
Runners-up: John McNaughton - Henry: Portrait of a Serial Killer and Kevin Costner - Dances with Wolves
Best Screenplay:
Ruth Prawer Jhabvala - Mr. and Mrs. Bridge
Runners-up: Whit Stillman - Metropolitan and Charles Burnett - To Sleep with Anger
Best Supporting Actor:
Bruce Davison - Longtime Companion
Runners-up: Joe Pesci - Goodfellas and John Turturro - Miller's Crossing
Best Supporting Actress:
Jennifer Jason Leigh - Miami Blues and Last Exit to Brooklyn
Runners-up: Joan Plowright - Avalon and Lorraine Bracco - Goodfellas
Special Awards:
Film Forum
Karen Cooper
Bruce Goldstein

References

External links
1990 Awards

1990
New York Film Critics Circle Awards
New York Film Critics Circle Awards
New York Film Critics Circle Awards
New York Film Critics Circle Awards
New York Film Critics Circle Awards